Clifford Samuel Avril (born April 8, 1986) is a former American football defensive end. He played college football at Purdue and was drafted in the third round of the 2008 NFL Draft by the Detroit Lions. He has also played for the Seattle Seahawks, with whom he won Super Bowl XLVIII and made a Pro Bowl.

Early years
Avril was born in Jacksonville, Florida, to Haitian parents. He attended Clay High School in Green Cove Springs, Florida, where he was a four-sport star in football, track and field, weightlifting, and basketball.  Avril was an All State player in basketball and football. He was an All-conference selection his junior year. As a senior in 2004, he was a second-team All-state selection and was named to The Florida Times-Union Super 24 team after recording 80 tackles, including 11 for loss and nine sacks, with four pass breakups, leading his team to an 11-2 record.

He also excelled in track & field during his junior and senior seasons. He captured a regional shot put title at the 2004 FHSAA 2A Region 2, recording a career-best throw of 15.91 meters (52 ft, 2.5 in). He earned a third-place finish in the shot put at the outdoor state finals.  In addition, he also had a 335-pound max bench press and posted a 4.6-second 40-yard dash time.

College career
Avril then attended Purdue University, where he started 12 games at strong-side linebacker and 23 at left defensive end. After converting to defensive end in his final two seasons at Purdue, he recorded 30 of his 35.5 tackles-for-losses and 12.5 of his 13 sacks from the left end position.

In 2004, he appeared in all 12 games, including four starts made 36 tackles (23 solo, 13 assists), including 3.0 for loss and 0.5 sacks, with one pass breakup and one forced fumble. In 2005, he appeared in 10 games, including four starts and had 33 tackles (21 solo, 12 assists), including 2.5 for loss. In 2006, he started all 14 games, the first four at linebacker and last 10 at defensive end and recorded 84 tackles (51 solo, 33 assists) 15.0 tackles-for-loss, six sacks and six pass breakups, two forced fumbles, one fumble recovery and one interception.

Professional career

Pre-draft

Detroit Lions
Avril was drafted in the third round (92nd overall) of the 2008 NFL Draft by the Detroit Lions. He signed a three-year, $1.634 million contract. In 2008, he recorded 23 tackles and five sacks. He was named to the Sporting News All-Rookie team. 2009 saw even better tackle statistics for Avril. He recorded 18 more tackles in 2009 than he did his rookie year in 2008. But his pass rushing ability stats did not improve much over his rookie year, as he recorded just a half sack more (5.5) in 2009.

In 2010, Avril posted the best stats of his career with 33 tackles and 8.5 sacks. Not to be outdone by this, Avril played in all 16 games for the first time in 2011. He had 36 tackles, and a team-high 11 sacks. Avril had more forced fumbles than any other defensive end with 6. He also had 3 fumble recoveries (one for a touchdown) to go along with an interception that was returned for a touchdown. Many sportswriters felt that he was worthy of the Pro Bowl, but Jared Allen, Jason Pierre-Paul, and Jason Babin were selected instead to the NFC roster.

On March 5, 2012, the Lions placed the non-exclusive franchise tag on Avril, keeping him in Detroit for the 2012 season. On August 5, Avril signed his tender, which was worth $10.6 million. Prior to the franchise tag, Avril rejected a 3-year, $30 million contract offered by the Lions. In 2012, Avril had 9.5 sacks, one forced fumble and one pass defensed, which Lions management considered a decline in performance from the previous year.

Seattle Seahawks
On March 13, 2013, Avril signed a two-year, $13 million contract with the Seattle Seahawks. In the 2013 season, he has been credited for his contribution to the Seahawks' Super Bowl XLVIII win.  He set a Super Bowl record by scoring only twelve seconds into the game with a safety stemming from a botched opening snap by the Broncos, and he later forced an interception that led to a touchdown. Following the Seahawks' victory, Avril became the first player in NFL history to win a Super Bowl after having been on a winless team.

In the 2014 season, after recording just 2 sacks over the first 10 games, Avril would register 3 in the last 6 games, coinciding with a 6-game winning streak during which the Seahawks defense allowed a total of 39 points. On December 19, 2014, Avril signed a 4-year extension with the Seahawks worth $28.5 million. Avril would also register a sack in the divisional round playoff game against the Carolina Panthers and NFC Championship game against the Green Bay Packers, both Seahawk victories. In Super Bowl XLIX, Avril recorded 2 tackles, but left in the third quarter with a concussion and did not return. The Seahawks failed to repeat as Super Bowl champions as they lost 28–24 to the New England Patriots.

In the 2015 season, Avril was evaluated by Pro Football Focus as the fifth best edge defender in the league at the halfway point of the season. Through those eight games, Avril recorded 30 tackles (20 solo), 3.5 sacks, 1 forced fumble, 5 pass deflections, and 5 tackles for loss.

In the 2016 season, Avril was named NFC Defensive Player of the Month for October. He was also named to his first Pro Bowl, and was ranked 56th by his peers on the NFL Top 100 Players of 2017.

In Week 4 of the 2017 season, Avril suffered a serious neck injury in the first quarter of Seattle's 46-18 win over the Indianapolis Colts. He was inadvertently kicked in his chin against the Colts and had been experiencing numbness in his arms. Seahawks head coach Pete Carroll commented on the injury saying Avril will be out "a while". He was placed on injured reserve on October 20, 2017.

On May 4, 2018, the Seahawks released Avril with a failed physical designation.

NFL career statistics

Regular season

NFL Trophy Tour 2018 Germany

Cliff Avril was a guest in Germany during the NFL Trophy Tour 2018, including in Hamburg and Cologne.

References

External links
 Official Website
 Seattle Seahawks bio
 Purdue Boilermakers bio

1986 births
Living people
American sportspeople of Haitian descent
People from Clay County, Florida
Players of American football from Jacksonville, Florida
American football linebackers
American football defensive ends
Purdue Boilermakers football players
Detroit Lions players
Seattle Seahawks players
National Conference Pro Bowl players
Ed Block Courage Award recipients